Natalia Petrovna Bekhtereva (July 7, 1924 – June 22, 2008) was a Soviet and Russian neuroscientist and psychologist who developed neurophysiological approaches to psychology, such as measuring the impulse activity of human neurons. She was a participant in the documentary films The Call of the Abyss and Storm of Consciousness, which aroused wide public interest. Candidate of Biological Sciences, Doctor of Medicine, Full Professor.

Biography 
She is Vladimir Bekhterev's granddaughter. She was brought up with her brother in an orphanage. She graduated from the First Pavlov State Medical University of St. Petersburg (1941–1947) and graduate school of the Pavlov Institute of Physiology. In the summer of 1941, more than 700 students entered the University; by the end of the training, only 4 graduates survived. The rest perished from war and hunger. She survived the Siege of Leningrad.

She worked as a junior research fellow at the Institute of Experimental Medicine, USSR Academy of Medical Sciences (1950–1954). After working her way up from a senior research fellow to the head of the laboratory and Deputy Director, she worked at the Research Neurosurgical Institute named after Professor Andrey L. Polenov of the USSR Ministry of Health (1954–1962). In 1959 she became a Doctor of Medicine. Since 1962 – at the Institute of Institute of Experimental Medicine, USSR Academy of Medical Sciences (the head of the Department of human neurophysiology; the Deputy Director for Research; from 1970 to 1990 – the Director).

In 1975, she became an academician of the USSR Academy of Medical Sciences (subsequently Russian Academy of Medical Sciences). In 1981, she became an academician of the Academy of Sciences of the Soviet Union. Starting in 1990, she was the scientific director of the Center "Brain" of the Academy of Sciences of the Soviet Union. In 1992 she became the head of the scientific group of the neurophysiology of thinking, creativity and consciousness of the Institute for Human Brain of the RAS.

She was Vice President of the International Union of Physiological Sciences (1974–1980) and Vice President of the International Organization for Psychophysiology (1982–1994).

She worked as editor-in-chief of the academic journals Human Physiology (1975–1987) and International Journal of Psychophysiology (1984–1994).

Deputy of the Supreme Soviet of the Soviet Union of the 8th convocation (1970–1974) and People's Deputy of the Soviet Union (1989–1991).

Rewards and titles 
 The Order of Lenin (July 6, 1984) – for great merits in the development of medical science, the training of scientific personnel.
 The Order of the Red Banner of Labour (1975).
 The Order of the Badge of Honour (1967).
 The Medal "For Labour Valour" (February 11, 1961) – for great merits in the field of protecting the health of the Soviet people and the development of medical science.
 The Gold medal of the Exhibition of Economic Achievements of the Soviet Union (1967 & 1974).
 Silver medal of the Exhibition of Economic Achievements of the Soviet Union (1976).
 Gold medal named after Vladimir M. Bekhterev – for a series of studies on the neurophysiological foundations of the higher mental functions of the human brain.
 The USSR State Prize 1985 in the field of science and technology (October 31, 1985) – for fundamental research on the physiology of the human brain.
 The Order "For Merit to the Fatherland" III class (July 14, 2004) – for merits in scientific and medical activity and many years of conscientious work.
 The Order "For Merit to the Fatherland" IV class (June 4, 1999) – for his great contribution to the development of domestic science, the training of highly qualified personnel and in connection with the 275th anniversary of the Russian Academy of Sciences.
 The Order of Friendship of Peoples (April 11, 1994) – for great personal contribution to the development of medical science and the training of highly qualified specialists for domestic health care.
 The Wiener Medal in Cybernetics by the American Society for Cybernetics (1972).
 Honorary Member of the Hungarian Society of Electrophysiologists since 1968.
 Honorary Member of the Czechoslovak Neurophysiological and Neurosurgical Societies named after Purkyně since 1989.
 Foreign Member of the Austrian Academy of Sciences since 1974.
 Foreign Member of the Academy of Sciences of Finland since 1990.
 Foreign Member of the American Academy of Medicine and Psychiatry since 1993.
 Full member of the International Academy of Ecology, Human and Nature Safety since 1997.
 Member of the Board of Directors of the International Organization for Psychophysiology since 1998.
 Honorary Doctor of the Saint-Petersburg University of Humanities and Social Sciences (2006).

Death 

She died in the morning of June 22, 2008 in Hamburg at the St. George's Hospital in the 84th year of life after a long illness.

Tribute 
On July 7, 2020, Google celebrated her 96th birthday with a Google Doodle.

6074 Bechtereva, a minor planet named after Natalia Bekhtereva.

The  is named after her.

Family 
The grandfather is Vladimir Bekhterev (1857–1927) — psychiatrist, neuropathologist, physiologist, psychologist, founder of reflexology. The father is Peter Bekhterev (1886–1938) – engineer and inventor. The mother is Zinaïda Bekhtereva – doctor.

First husband is Vsevolod Medvedev (1924–2008) – physiologist. Son from the first marriage is Svyatoslav Medvedev (1949) – physiologist.

Second husband is Ivan Kashtelyan (died in 1990) – economist. The stepson is Alexander (died in 1990).

The granddaughter is Natalia Medvedeva – psychiatrist.

Publications 
Bekhtereva published more than 360 works, some of them in English, including: 
 1962. Biopotentials of Cerebral Hemispheres in Brain Tumors.
 1978. Neurophysiological Aspects of Human Mental Activity.    
 1981. Psychophysiology Today and Tomorrow. (editor).

Documentary films with her participation 
  Зов бездны (The Call of the Abyss); 
  Штурм сознания. Громкое дело (Storm of Consciousness High-profile case).

See also 
 Vladimir Bekhterev

References 
 "Наталья Бехтерева — какой мы её знали {сборник эссе, очерков}", под общей редакцией С. В. Медведева, г. Москва, издательство "АСТ", г. Санкт-Петербург, Сова, 2009 г. – 256 с.: иллюстрации; 16 с.

Notes

External links 
 Профиль Натальи Петровны Бехтеревой на официальном сайте РАН 
 Биография 
 Биография2 
 Наталья Бехтерева не любила, когда мозг сравнивали с компьютером // RIA Novosti. — 23.06.2008. 
 Natalya Bekhtereva at the ceo.spb.ru

1924 births
2008 deaths
20th-century women scientists
Physicians from Saint Petersburg
Academicians of the Russian Academy of Medical Sciences
Academicians of the USSR Academy of Medical Sciences
Full Members of the Russian Academy of Sciences
Full Members of the USSR Academy of Sciences
Eighth convocation members of the Supreme Soviet of the Soviet Union
Parapsychologists
Russian women neuroscientists
Russian women psychologists
Women cyberneticists
Soviet psychologists
Psychologists from Saint Petersburg
Residents of the Benois House